Anouk Rijff (born 6 April 1996) is a retired Dutch professional racing cyclist. In 2015 and 2016 she rode for the Lotto–Soudal Ladies team and for Lensworld-Kuota in 2017.

As a junior, she represented the Netherlands at the 2013 European Road Championships and at the 2014 European Road Championships in the women's junior road race. In 2017 she didn't race because of a chronic deficiency of vitamins. This was also the reason why she ended her cycling career in October 2017.

References

External links

1996 births
Living people
Dutch female cyclists
People from Tiel
Cyclists from Gelderland